The following is a list of Australian television ratings for the year 1997.

Network shares 

* Data gathered by then ratings supplier: A.C Neilsen Australia

Highest rated programs

Top rated regular programmes

See also

Television ratings in Australia

References

1997
1997 in Australian television